Zeki Ergezen (2 December 1949 – 2 October 2020) was a Turkish politician.

Career
He was a founding member of the Justice and Development Party. He was the Minister of Public Works and Housing from 2002 to 2005 in the cabinet of Abdullah Gül and the first cabinet of Recep Tayyip Erdogan.

Ergezen was born in Bitlis. He died on 2 October 2020 at the Başkent hospital in Ankara where he was treated for cancer.

References

External links 

1949 births
2020 deaths
Government ministers of Turkey
Deputies of Bitlis
Justice and Development Party (Turkey) politicians
Ministers of Public Works of Turkey
Members of the 23rd Parliament of Turkey
Members of the 22nd Parliament of Turkey
Members of the 21st Parliament of Turkey
Members of the 20th Parliament of Turkey